Etolorex is an anorectic of the amphetamine class. It was never marketed.

Synthesis

Made by the reaction of chlorphentermine with 2-Chloroethanol.

See also
 3,4-Dichloroamphetamine
 Cericlamine
 Chlorphentermine
 Cloforex
 Clortermine
 Methylenedioxyphentermine
 Phentermine

References 

Primary alcohols
Substituted amphetamines
Anorectics
Chloroarenes
Monoamine releasing agents
Abandoned drugs